Iryna Prasiantsova (born 29 September 1996) is a Belarusian modern pentathlete.

She participated at the 2018 World Modern Pentathlon Championships, winning a medal. She has qualified to represent Belarus at the 2020 Summer Olympics.

References

External links

Living people
1996 births
Belarusian female modern pentathletes
World Modern Pentathlon Championships medalists
Modern pentathletes at the 2014 Summer Youth Olympics
21st-century Belarusian women